The Prevention of Offences Act 1851 (14 & 15 Vict c 19) is an Act of the Parliament of the United Kingdom.

It is still in force in the Republic of Ireland.

It was retained for the Republic of Ireland by section 2(2)(a) of, and Part 4 of Schedule 1 to, the Statute Law Revision Act 2007. There is a saving for this Act in section 2(2)(b) of the Statute Law Revision Act 2009.

The Act was repealed for England and Wales and Northern Ireland by section 1(1) of, and Group 5 of Part I of Schedule 1 to, the Statute Law (Repeals) Act 1989.

Section 4
This section was replaced by section 20 of the Offences against the Person Act 1861.

Section 5

This section was repealed for England and Wales by
section 10(2) of, and Part III of Schedule 3 to, the Criminal Law Act 1967. It was repealed for the Republic of Ireland by
section 16 of, and the Third Schedule to, the Criminal Law Act, 1997.

Sections 6 to 14

Section 6 was replaced, in so far as it related to malicious injuries to property, by section 35 of the Malicious Damage Act 1861.

Section 11 was repealed by section 119 of, and Part I of Schedule 7 to, the Police and Criminal Evidence Act 1984.

Sections 12 and 13 were repealed for England and Wales by section 33(3) of, and Part II of Schedule 3 to, the Theft Act 1968.

Section 14 was repealed for the Republic of Ireland by
section 16 of, and the Third Schedule to, the Criminal Law Act, 1997.

Parliamentary debates
http://hansard.millbanksystems.com/lords/1851/feb/24/minutes (first reading)
http://hansard.millbanksystems.com/lords/1851/mar/14/prevention-of-offences-bill (second reading)
http://hansard.millbanksystems.com/lords/1851/may/30/minutes (third reading)
http://hansard.millbanksystems.com/commons/1851/jun/04/minutes (first reading)
http://hansard.millbanksystems.com/commons/1851/jun/13/minutes (second reading)
http://hansard.millbanksystems.com/commons/1851/jun/24/minutes (third reading)
http://hansard.millbanksystems.com/lords/1851/jun/27/prevention-of-offences-bill
http://hansard.millbanksystems.com/lords/1851/jul/03/minutes (royal assent)

References

External links
 The Prevention of Offences Act 1851, as enacted, from Google Books.

United Kingdom Acts of Parliament 1851